Jewish eschatology is the area of Jewish theology concerned with events that will happen in the end of days and related concepts. This includes the ingathering of the exiled diaspora, the coming of a Jewish Messiah, afterlife, and the revival of the dead. In Judaism, the end times are usually called the "end of days" (aḥarit ha-yamim, אחרית הימים), a phrase that appears several times in the Tanakh.

These beliefs have evolved over time, and there is no evidence before 200 BCE of Jewish belief in a personal afterlife with reward or punishment.

Sources

In Judaism, the main textual source for the belief in the end of days and accompanying events is the Tanakh or Hebrew Bible. The roots of Jewish eschatology are to be found in the pre-exile prophets, including Isaiah and Jeremiah, and the exilic prophets Ezekiel and Deutero-Isaiah. The main tenets of Jewish eschatology are the following, in no particular order, elaborated in the Book of Isaiah, the Book of Jeremiah and the Book of Ezekiel.

The End of Days

War of Gog and Magog

According to Ezekiel chapter 38, the "war of Gog and Magog" is a climactic war that will happen at the end of the Jewish exile. According to biblical commentator and rabbi David Kimhi, this war will take place in Jerusalem. However, Hasidic tradition holds that the war will not occur, as the sufferings of exile have already made up for it.

Events to occur

 God redeems the Jewish people from their captivity that began with the Babylonian Exile, in a new Exodus
 God returns the Jewish people to the Land of Israel
 God restores the kingly House of David and the Temple in Jerusalem
 God appoints a regent from the House of David (i.e. the Messiah) to lead the Jewish people and the world, and usher in the Messianic Age, characterised by justice, righteousness, and peace
 All nations recognize that the God of Israel is the only true God
 God resurrects the dead
 God creates a new heaven and a new earth

World to come

The afterlife is known as olam ha-ba (“world to come", עולם הבא in Hebrew), and is related to concepts of Gan Eden, the Heavenly "Garden in Eden", or Paradise, and Gehinnom. The phrase “olam ha-ba” itself does not occur in the Hebrew Bible. The accepted halakha is that it is impossible for living human beings to know what the world to come is like.

Second Temple period
In the late Second Temple period, beliefs about the ultimate fate of an individual were diverse. The Pharisees and Essenes believed in the immortality of the soul, but the Sadducees did not.<ref name="Antiquity">ed. Jacob Neusner, Alan Jeffery Avery-Peck Judaism in Late Antiquity: Part Four: Death, Life-After-Death," 2000 Page 187 III. THE DEAD SEA SCROLLS 8. DEATH, RESURRECTION, AND LIFE AFTER DEATH IN THE QUMRAN THE DEAD SEA SCROLLS. chapter by Philip R. Davies University of Sheffield. "In the late Second Temple Period, beliefs about the ultimate fate of the individual were diverse. It is well-known that Josephus, in his description of the four Jewish "sects" (and supported by Matt. ... in the resurrection while the Pharisees did, and the Essenes subscribed to the doctrine of the immortality of the soul (War 2.154: "...although bodies are corruptible and their matter unstable, souls are immortal and live forever...")"</ref> The Dead Sea Scrolls, Jewish pseudepigrapha and Jewish magical papyri all reflect this variety of opinions.

Medieval rabbinical views
While all classical rabbinic sources discuss the afterlife, Medieval scholars dispute the nature of existence in the "End of Days" after the Messianic Age. While Maimonides describes an entirely spiritual existence for souls, which he calls "disembodied intellects,” Nachmanides discusses an intensely spiritual existence on Earth, where spirituality and physicality are merged. Both agree that life after death is as Maimonides describes the "End of Days." This existence entails an extremely heightened understanding of and connection to the Divine Presence. This view is shared by all classical rabbinic scholars.

According to Maimonides, any non-Jew who lives according to the Seven Laws of Noah is regarded as a righteous gentile, and is assured of a place in the world to come, the final reward of the righteous.Encyclopedia Talmudit (Hebrew edition, Israel, 5741/1981, entry Ben Noah, end of article); note the variant reading of Maimonides and the references in the footnote

There is a great deal of surviving rabbinic material concerning the fate of the soul after death, its experiences, and where it goes. At various points in the afterlife journey, the soul may encounter: Hibbut ha-kever, the pains and experiences of the physico-spiritual dissolution or reconfiguration within the grave; Dumah, the angel in charge of funerary matters; Satan as the angel of death or other equally grim figure; the Kaf ha-Kela, the ensnarement or confinement of the stripped-down soul within various ghostly material reallocations (devised for the purpose of cleansing a soul of contamination but not severe enough to warrant Gehinnom, see Tanya Chapter 8)); Gehinnom (pure purgatory); and Gan Eden (heavenly respite or paradise, a purified state). All classical rabbinic scholars agree that these concepts are beyond typical human understanding, so these ideas are expressed throughout rabbinic literature via parables and analogies.Gehinnom is fairly well defined in rabbinic literature. It is sometimes translated as "hell", but is more similar to the Nicene Christian view of Purgatory than to its Hell. Rabbinic thought maintains that souls are not tortured in Gehinnom forever; the longest that one can be there is said to be eleven months, with the exception of heretics and extremely sinful Jews. This is why Jews mourning for near relatives will not recite mourner's kaddish for more than eleven months after a death. Gehinnom is considered a spiritual forge where the soul is purified for its eventual ascent to Gan Eden ("Garden of Eden").
Rabbinic legends
Rabbinic literature includes many legends about the World to Come and the two Gardens of Eden. As compiled by Louis Ginzberg in the book Legends of the Jews these include the world to come, which is called Paradise, and said to have a double gate made of carbuncle guarded by 600,000 shining angels.  Seven clouds of glory overshadow Paradise, and under them, in the center of Paradise, stands the tree of life. The tree of life overshadows Paradise too, and it has fifteen thousand different tastes and aromas that winds blow all across Paradise. Under the tree of life are many pairs of canopies, one of stars and the other of sun and moon, while a cloud of glory separates the two. In each pair of canopies sits a rabbinic scholar who explains the Torah to one. When one enters Paradise, one is proffered by Michael the archangel to God on the altar of the Temple in the heavenly Jerusalem.  One is transfigured into an angel, with the ugliest person becoming as beautiful and shining as "the grains of a silver pomegranate upon which fall the rays of the sun”. The angels that guard Paradise's gate adorn the soul in seven clouds of glory, crown it with gems and pearls and gold, place eight myrtles in the hand, and praise it for being righteous while leading it to a garden of eight hundred roses and myrtles watered by many rivers. In the garden is one's canopy, its beauty according to one's merit, but each canopy has four rivers – milk, honey, wine, and balsam – flowing out from it, and has a golden vine and thirty shining pearls hanging from it. Under each canopy is a table of gems and pearls attended to by sixty angels.  The light of Paradise is the light of the righteous people therein. Each day in Paradise one wakes up a child and goes to bed an elder to enjoy the pleasures of childhood, youth, adulthood, and old age. In each corner of Paradise is a forest of 800,000 trees, the least among these greater than the best herbs and spices, attended to by 800,000 sweetly singing angels. Paradise is divided into seven sub-paradises, each one 120,000 miles long and wide.  Depending on one's merit, a soul is assigned to one of these sections of Paradise: the first is made of glass and cedar and is for converts to Judaism; the second is of silver and cedar and is for penitents; the third is of silver, gold, gems and pearls, and is for the Patriarchs, Moses and Aaron, the Israelites that left Egypt and lived in the wilderness, and the kings of Israel; the fourth is of rubies and olive wood and is for the holy and steadfast in faith; the fifth is like the third, except a river flows through it and its bed was woven by Eve and the angels, and it is for the Messiah and Elijah; and the sixth and seventh divisions are not described, except that they are respectively for those who died doing pious acts and those who died from illness in expiation for Israel's sins.

Above this Paradise is the higher Gan Eden, where God is enthroned and explains the Torah to its inhabitants. The higher Gan Eden contains 310 worlds and is divided into seven compartments. The compartments are not described, though it is implied that each compartment is greater than the previous one and is made open to a soul based on its merit. The first compartment is for Jewish martyrs, the second for those who drowned, the third for "Rabban Yohanan ben Zakkai and his disciples," the fourth for those whom the cloud of glory carried off, the fifth for penitents, the sixth for youths who have never sinned; and the seventh for the poor who lived decently and studied Torah.

Resurrection of the dead

An early explicit mention of resurrection in Hebrew texts is the Vision of the Valley of Dry Bones in the Book of Ezekiel dated somewhere around 539 BCE. Alan Segal argues that this narrative was intended as a metaphor for national rebirth, promising the Jews return to Israel and reconstruction of the Temple, not as a description of personal resurrection.

The Book of Daniel promised literal resurrection to the Jews, in concrete detail. Alan Segal interprets Daniel as writing that with the coming of the Archangel Michael, misery would beset the world, and only those whose names were in a divine book would be resurrected. Moreover, Daniel's promise of resurrection was intended only for the most righteous and the most sinful because the afterlife was a place for the virtuous individuals to be rewarded and the sinful individuals to receive eternal punishment.

Greek and Persian culture influenced Jewish sects to believe in an afterlife between the 6th and 4th centuries BCE as well.

The Hebrew Bible, at least as seen through interpretation of Bavli Sanhedrin, contains frequent reference to resurrection of the dead. The Mishnah (c. 200) lists belief in the resurrection of the dead as one of three essential beliefs necessary for a Jew to participate in it:

In the late Second Temple period, the Pharisees believed in resurrection, while Essenes and Sadducees did not. During the Rabbinic period, beginning in the late first century and carrying on to the present, the works of Daniel were included into the Hebrew Bible, signaling the adoption of Jewish resurrection into the officially sacred texts.

Jewish liturgy, most notably the Amidah, contains references to the tenet of the bodily resurrection of the dead. In contemporary Judaism, both Orthodox Judaism and Conservative Judaism maintain the traditional references to it in their liturgy. However, many Conservative Jews interpret the tenet metaphorically rather than literally. Reform and Reconstructionist Judaism have altered traditional references to the resurrection of the dead in the liturgy ("who gives life to the dead") to refer to "who gives life to all."

The last judgment
In Judaism, the day of judgment happens every year on Rosh Hashanah; therefore, the belief in a last day of judgment for all mankind is disputed. Some rabbis hold that there will be such a day following the resurrection of the dead. Others hold that there is no need for that because of Rosh Hashanah. Yet others hold that this accounting and judgment happens when one dies. Other rabbis hold that the last judgment only applies to the gentile nations and not the Jewish people.

In contemporary Judaism

Irving Greenberg, representing an Open Orthodox viewpoint, describes the afterlife as a central Jewish teaching, deriving from the belief in reward and punishment. According to Greenberg, suffering Medieval Jews emphasized the World to Come as a counterpoint to the difficulties of this life, while early Jewish modernizers portrayed Judaism as interested only in this world as a counterpoint to "otherworldly" Christianity. Greenberg sees each of these views as leading to an undesired extreme – overemphasizing the afterlife leads to asceticism, while devaluing the afterlife deprives Jews of the consolation of eternal life and justice – and calls for a synthesis, in which Jews can work to perfect this world, while also recognizing the immortality of the soul.

Conservative Judaism both affirms belief in the world beyond (as referenced in the Amidah and Maimonides' Thirteen Precepts of Faith) while recognizing that human understanding is limited and we cannot know exactly what the world beyond consists of.  Reform and Reconstructionist Judaism affirm belief in the afterlife, though they downplay the theological implications in favor of emphasizing the importance of the "here and now," as opposed to reward and punishment.

Jewish messianism

The Hebrew word mashiach (or moshiach) refers to the Jewish idea of the messiah. In biblical times the title mashiach was awarded to someone in a high position of nobility and greatness. For example, Cohen ha-Mašíaḥ means High Priest. While the name of the Jewish Messiah is considered to be one of the things that precede creation, he is not considered divine, in contrast to Christianity where Jesus is both divine and the Messiah.

In the Talmudic era the title Mashiach or מלך המשיח, Méleḵ ha-Mašíaḥ literally means "the anointed King". The Messiah is to be a human leader, physically descended from the Davidic line, who will rule and unite the people of Israel and will usher in the Messianic Age of global and universal peace.

Early Second Temple period (516 BCE – c.220 BCE)

Early in the Second Temple period hopes for a better future are described in the Jewish scriptures. After the return from the Babylonian exile, Cyrus the Great was called "messiah" in Isaiah, due to his role in the return of the Jews exiles.

Later Second Temple period (c.220 BCE – 70 CE)

A number of messianic ideas developed during the later Second Temple Period, ranging from this-worldy, political expectations, to apocalyptic expectations of an endtime in which the dead would be resurrected and the Kingdom of Heaven would be established on earth. The Messiah might be a kingly "son of David" or a more heavenly "son of man", but "Messianism became increasingly eschatological, and eschatology was decisively influenced by apocalypticism," while "messianic expectations became increasingly focused on the figure of an individual savior. According to Zwi Werblowsky, "the Messiah no longer symbolized the coming of the new age, but he was somehow supposed to bring it about. The "Lord's anointed" thus became the "savior and redeemer" and the focus of more intense expectations and doctrines." Messianic ideas developed both by new interpretations (pesher, midrash'') of the Jewish scriptures, but also by visionary revelations.

Talmud

The Babylonian Talmud (200–500 CE), tractate Sanhedrin, contains a long discussion of the events leading to the coming of the Messiah. Throughout their history Jews have compared these passages (and others) to contemporary events in search of signs of the Messiah's imminent arrival, continuing into present times.

The Talmud tells many stories about the Messiah, some of which represent famous Talmudic rabbis as receiving personal visitations from Elijah the Prophet and the Messiah.

Rabbinic commentaries

In rabbinic literature, the rabbis elaborated and explained the prophecies that were found in the Hebrew Bible along with the oral law and rabbinic traditions about its meaning.

Maimonides' commentary to tractate Sanhedrin stresses a relatively naturalistic interpretation of the Messiah, de-emphasizing miraculous elements. His commentary became widely (although not universally) accepted in the non- or less-mystical branches of Orthodox Judaism.

Contemporary views

Orthodox Judaism
The belief in a human Messiah of the Davidic line is a universal tenet of faith among Orthodox Jews and one of Maimonides' thirteen principles of faith.

Some authorities in Orthodox Judaism believe that this era will lead to supernatural events culminating in a bodily resurrection of the dead. Maimonides, on the other hand, holds that the events of the Messianic Era are not specifically connected with the resurrection.

Conservative Judaism
Conservative Judaism varies in its teachings. While it retains traditional references to a personal redeemer and prayers for the restoration of the Davidic line in the liturgy, Conservative Jews are more inclined to accept the idea of a Messianic Era:

Reform Judaism
Reform Judaism generally concurs with the more liberal Conservative perspective of a future Messianic Era rather than a human Messiah.

See also
 Saoshyant

Notes

References

External links

Jewish Encyclopedia: Eschatology
The Origin of Jewish Eschatology, by Nathaniel Schmidt